Trinidad and Tobago competed in the 2019 Pan American Games in Lima, Peru from July 26 to August 11, 2019.

On July 12, 2019, named a team of 98 athletes (58 men and 48 women) competing in 18 sports.

During the opening ceremony of the games, sailor Andrew Lewis carried the flag of the country as part of the parade of nations.

Competitors 
The following is the list of number of competitors (per gender) participating at the games per sport/discipline.

Medalists 

|  style="text-align:left; vertical-align:top;"|

Archery 

Trinidad and Tobago qualified one male archer.

Men

Badminton 

Trinidad and Tobago qualified a team of two badminton athletes (one per gender). The country later declined the men's quota.

Women

Beach volleyball 

Trinidad and Tobago qualified four beach volleyball athletes (two men and two women).

Men
1 Pair (2 athletes)

Women
1 Pair (2 athletes)

Boxing 

Trinidad and Tobago qualified four male boxers.

Men

Canoeing

Sprint 

Men

Cycling

Road 
Men

Women

Track 

Sprint

Team pursuit

Keirin

Omnium

Madison

Field hockey 

Trinidad and Tobago qualified a men's team of 16 athletes, by being ranked among the top three unqualified nations from the 2017 Men's Pan American Cup.

Men's tournament 

Preliminary round

Quarter-finals

Cross over

Fifth place match

Judo 

Trinidad and Tobago qualified one female judoka.

Women

Rowing 

Women

Rugby sevens 

Trinidad and Tobago qualified a women's team of 12 athletes, by finishing as runner ups at the 2018 RAN Women's Sevens. This will mark the country's debut in the sport at the Pan American Games.

Women's tournament 

Pool stage

5th–8th classification

Seventh place match

Sailing 

Men

Women

Shooting 

Men

Women

Swimming

Table tennis 

Trinidad and Tobago qualified one female table tennis athlete.

Women

Taekwondo 

Trinidad and Tobago received one wildcard in the women's +67 kg event.

Kyorugi
Women

See also 
Trinidad and Tobago at the 2020 Summer Olympics

References 

Nations at the 2019 Pan American Games
2019
2019 in Trinidad and Tobago sport